Juan Pablo Raba Vidal (born 14 January 1977) is a Colombian film, TV and telenovela actor, best known internationally for his role as Gustavo Gaviria in the 2015 Netflix series Narcos.

Early life 
Raba was born in Bogotá, Colombia where he graduated from Colegio Nueva Granada. After his parents' divorce, he was raised in Spain by his Argentinian father. There, he earned a baccalaureate degree and started studying advertising, but soon decided this was not what he wanted in life. He left his studies incomplete and went to live in Argentina.

Career
Raba subsequently returned to Colombia and worked as a model. He sought work from the Colombian TV channel Caracol, who suggested that he take acting lessons. He took acting classes in Bogota with Edgardo Roman and then continued his studies in New York at the Lee Strasberg Institute.

Not long after, he accompanied a friend to an acting class where Colombian professor Edgardo Roman was impressed by Raba's acting ability. Encouraged, Raba began attending auditions. Two months after his first audition, Caracol channel asked him to co-star in the television series Amor En Forma. In 1999, he played a small part in the TV series Marido y mujer.

Immediately after, he took the leading part in the TV series La reina de Queens. Around the same time, he appeared in the theatrical play Chronicle of a Death Foretold, based on the book by Gabriel García Márquez.

Later the Venezuelan channel RCTV asked him to co-star in the telenovela Viva La Pepa. This led to an offer to appear in La niña de mis ojos, which launched Raba's international career. In 2002's Mi gorda bella, Raba played Orestes Villanueva Mercuri, who falls in love with the good hearted Valentina.

In 2004, when he filmed for RCTV  the TV series Estrambótica Anastasia. In 2005, he returned to Colombia and filmed for the channel Caracol the TV series Por amor a Gloria. In 2006 included he appeared in the movie Una Abuela Virgen and as the main character in the TV film Soltera y sin Compromiso.

In the following years he had parts in several soap operas. In 2008 Raba appeared in El Cartel de los sapos, in a 2009 episode of Tiempo final and in an episode of Mental. After that he had a part in Los Caballeros Las Prefieren Brutas. In 2013 he was a main character in Los secretos de Lucía.

In 2014, he was cast as Gustavo Gaviria, the cousin of Pablo Escobar in Narcos. He stated that this was a very personal story for him since his uncle was killed by Escobar. In 2015 Raba joined the third season of Agents of S.H.I.E.L.D. as the Inhuman Joey Gutiérrez.

Personal life
In 2003, he met Colombian journalist Paula Quinteros, whom he married on 6 December in a barefoot Celtic ceremony in Los Roques, Venezuela.

In 2006, he and Paula announced their separation, which subsequently resulted in their divorce in 2007. In 2007, he dated Venezuelan soap star Marjorie de Sousa, a relationship which lasted over a year.

In August 2011, he married television presenter Mónica Fonseca in a private ceremony in Miami, United States. On 19 July 2012, his wife gave birth to their son, Joaquín Raba Fonseca. Raba is an active cyclist and now resides in Miami. With his family, he has been very active in human and animal rights organizations.

Filmography

Films

Television

References

External links
 

1977 births
Living people
Colombian people of Argentine descent
Male actors from Bogotá
20th-century Colombian male actors
21st-century Colombian male actors
Colombian male telenovela actors
Colombian male film actors